Chaetomiopsis is a genus of fungi within the Chaetomiaceae family. This is a monotypic genus, containing the single species Chaetomiopsis dinae.

References

External links
Chaetomiopsis at Index Fungorum

Sordariales
Monotypic Sordariomycetes genera